Michiel P. Hoogeveen (born 6 July 1989) is a Dutch politician of the right-wing conservative JA21 party. He started his career in the financial sector and as a freelance North Korea researcher. He became a member of Forum for Democracy (FVD) in 2016 and was elected to the States of South Holland three years later. He left the party in 2020 and subsequently joined JA21, which he has been representing in the European Parliament as part of the European Conservatives and Reformists (ECR) since April 2021.

Early life and education 
Hoogeveen was born and raised in the South Holland city of Leiden. He attended the secondary school Bonaventura College and went to The Hague University of Applied Sciences, earning a Bachelor of Business Administration degree in 2011. He then studied political science at Vrije Universiteit Amsterdam and graduated with a Master of Science degree in 2013 after completing his thesis about inter-Korean economic relations.

Early career 
Hoogeveen has worked at several banks including KAS Bank and he served as an independent researcher of North Korea at the same time. He traveled to the country three times between 2014 and 2017.

In a 2016 opinion piece, he called the policies of the West and the United Nations to stop North Korea's nuclear weapons program a failure, saying that the condemnations and sanctions following nuclear tests were not having any effect. He instead called for diplomatic talks with North Korea. A book by Hoogeveen called  (The hermit kingdom: about the rise and future of North Korea) was published by Blue Tiger in 2018. He has told that the book was intended to stop the flood of disinformation, and he managed to paint a nuanced picture of North Korea "without glossing over Kim Jong-un's dictatorship" according to one review in Trends magazine. Hoogeveen has also served on the board of Pugwash Netherlands, an organization addressing weapons of mass destruction.

Politics 
He joined the right-wing conservative Forum for Democracy (FVD) party in 2016 after having attended a speech by party leader Thierry Baudet. Hoogeveen participated in the March 2019 provincial elections as the party's ninth candidate in South Holland and was elected to the States of South Holland. Two months later, he ran for Member of the European Parliament in the election as FVD's fifth candidate. He left his job as a risk consultant at KPMG to join the campaign. In 2019 Hoogeveen, told in an interview on Dutch withdrawal from the European Union, that thinking on a European level is undermining the Dutch identity. He has since clarified his position, stating that he favoured reforming the EU and the Eurozone instead of an immediate withdrawal. He received 9,521 preference votes, but FVD's three seats were not sufficient for Hoogeveen to be elected. After the election, Hoogeveen became a press officer and political adviser of MEPs Derk Jan Eppink, Rob Roos, and Rob Rooken.

A crisis broke out within the party in November 2020 after newspaper Het Parool had written that antisemitic, Nazi, and homophobic thoughts were being held and expressed by members of Forum for Democracy's youth wing. An internal election was subsequently held to determine the future of Thierry Baudet. Hoogeveen called on members to vote him out. After Baudet had received support from a majority of the voters in December, Hoogeveen left the party. He decided to keep his seat, and he was joined by four more States of South Holland members of FVD. He later joined the splinter party JA21 and kept his position as press officer and political adviser, as Eppink, Roos, and Rooken had all joined that party as well.

He was JA21's ninth candidate in the 2021 general election, but he was not elected to the House of Representatives due to the party winning three seats. Hoogeveen personally received 337 preference votes. Derk Jan Eppink had been the third candidate and was thus elected to the House, leaving a vacant seat in the European Parliament for Hoogeveen to fill. He was installed on 15 April as part of the European Conservatives and Reformists political group and left the States of South Holland the following month. Hoogeveen became JA21's spokesperson for economic and monetary affairs, international trade, and gender equality, and he is on the following committees and delegations:
 Committee on Economic and Monetary Affairs (vice-chair since May 2021, member since April 2021)
 Delegation for relations with the United States (member since April 2021)
 Committee on International Trade (substitute member since April 2021)
 Delegation for relations with the Korean Peninsula (substitute member since April 2021)
 Committee on Women's Rights and Gender Equality (substitute member since April 2021)

In 2022, during a period of high inflation, Hoogeveen blamed high government spending and monetary policy. He also continued to criticize the West's approach towards North Korea; he said denuclearization of North Korea would not be achieved through directly demanding it. He instead proposed to normalize relations such that they would feel safe to lower their defenses.

Personal life 
While a Member of the European Parliament, Hoogeveen moved from Leiden to nearby Oegstgeest.

References

External links
Michiel HOOGEVEEN, MEPs European Parliament

Living people
1989 births
Politicians from Leiden
MEPs for the Netherlands 2019–2024
JA21 politicians
Vrije Universiteit Amsterdam alumni
The Hague University of Applied Sciences alumni
Members of the Provincial Council of South Holland
Forum for Democracy (Netherlands) politicians
21st-century Dutch politicians
Experts on North Korea
Dutch bankers
Political staffers